The Lokka Reservoir (in Finnish: Lokan tekojärvi, Lokan allas, short form Lokka), is a  reservoir, upstream of the Luiro River in Sodankylä, in northern Finland. Depending on the water level, its area ranges from 216 to 418 km². The corresponding water levels above mean sea level are 240–245 meters. The filling of the reservoir Lokka began in 1967, and with this reservoir, the amount of water coming to the power plants in Kemijoki could be regulated. Lokka has also been famous for its rich fish population. There are also populations of white-tailed eagles at the reservoir. These do not migrate south for the winter, instead they stay at Lokka to feed on fish left by local fishermen.

Lokka is connected to the Porttipahta Reservoir through the Vuotso Canal.

Kemijoki basin
Reservoirs in Finland
Lakes of Sodankylä